"Backwards" is the first episode of science fiction sitcom Red Dwarf Series III, and the thirteenth in the series run. It premiered on the British television channel BBC2 on 14 November 1989. Written by Rob Grant and Doug Naylor, and directed by Ed Bye, the episode has the crew travel to an alternate Earth where time runs backwards.

The episode marks the first regular appearances of Robert Llewellyn's Kryten, Hattie Hayridge's version of Holly, the new spaceship Starbug, better production values, and a change in direction of story themes that would cement the show's cult status. The story was later reformulated as a novel by the same name. The episode was re-mastered, along with the rest of the first three series, in 1998.

Plot
Following the events of Parallel Universe, Dave Lister (Craig Charles) gave birth to twins who had to be sent back to the universe of their origin because of his universe's law. At the same time, the ship's computer Holly underwent a transformation to become his alternate universe counterpart Hilly (Hattie Hayridge) whom he fell madly in love with, while the others came across the broken pieces of the mechanoid Kryten (Robert Llewellyn), after he crashed on an asteroid while riding Lister's space bike, leading to Lister having to salvage and rebuild him, consequentially causing him to lose his old personality.

Some time after these events, Arnold Rimmer (Chris Barrie) takes Kryten out for a piloting test with Starbug 1, only for the pair to be sucked into a time hole and crash-land on a planet similar to Earth. When the pair see a sign written backwards and people performing actions and speaking backwards, Holly concludes they are on Earth in the distant future where time is now running backwards.

Kryten and Rimmer are initially disgusted by the "backwards" behaviour of people, but soon opt to use their forwardness to their advantage and apply as an entertainment act called, backwards, "The Sensational Reverse Brothers", until they can be rescued.

Lister and Cat (Danny John-Jules) finally track them down three weeks later in Starbug 2, but upon arriving, Lister is confused by the "backwards" nature of time, including the fact he has arrived with a feeling of cracked ribs and a black eye. Lister and Cat, after arriving, initially assume that they are in Bulgaria, and then finally understanding the nature of things when they realise they're in England and everything is backwards, and find Rimmer and Kryten enjoying themselves in their new jobs. Lister and Cat fail to convince the pair to leave, especially when Lister mentions a few examples of the backwards reality's bad sides. When they are fired for starting a fight, Kryten realises it is about to happen in reverse, resulting in Lister discovering his injuries are to be healed in it. Realising they cannot stay, Kryten and Rimmer decide to return to their time with the others, a notion reinforced by Cat's horrifying discovery of what happens to someone trying to relieve themselves in reverse.

Production

With Rob Grant and Doug Naylor directly involved with the third series, under their Grant Naylor Productions team, they radically changed the look of the show. The opening credits sequence sported a new rock guitar version of the Red Dwarf theme tune playing over clips from the series. The opening sequence ends with the first appearance of the official logo of the show which was designed by DeWinters. Mel Bibby had also come on board the crew and re-designed the sets. His inspiration from Ridley Scott's Alien film clearly shown in the new set's murky and run-down feel.

Costumes were overhauled as well, with costume designer Howard Burden bringing in a stylish new look to the crew. Lister's jacket outfit, having been designed with his art school background in mind, included a voluptuous woman riding a rocket on the back. This woman had indeed been intended to be Wilma Flintstone but was changed to a generic looking female once the legality of using The Flintstones image arose. Rimmer's tunic uniform served as implying his devotion to duty as well as his hologrammatic status. While the Cat's wardrobe reached new heights in the fashion stakes, Kryten's appearance was based on the Series II look but produced more successfully.

Effects also featured more heavily in the new series. The barroom brawl with plenty of fake glass featured a stunt double hurling through a window on the set. Bluescreen backgrounds were used for the actors to film against which was then merged with the cloaked Starbug location footage. Close-up shots were merely filmed on top of a raised platform with only the sky visible in the background.

Starbug was introduced as the new spaceship in place of Blue Midget. Grant and Naylor felt that Blue Midget did not work well set-wise because of size constraints so they requested that Peter Wragg, and his visual effects team, come up with a design for another ship. The final design, initially called White Midget, was shown to Grant and Naylor and they liked it, but they thought it looked more like a bug so settled on the name Starbug.

The Series III pre-credits scroll detailing the back story was actually intended to be an episode in its own right. Titled "Dad", the episode would have tied the loose ends from series two's "Parallel Universe" where Lister would have given birth to the twins and given them back to the parallel universe Lister version. Grant and Naylor had partially written the script but they decided to scrap the idea as they felt it to be unfunny and potentially offensive to women.

Many of the location scenes for "Backwards" were filmed in and around Manchester. The lake and woodland scenes were filmed in Tatton Park. Series creator and writer Rob Grant can be seen standing on the street with sunglasses smoking a cigarette backwards. The episode's theme gave the writers an opportunity to insert some in-joke dialogue that otherwise would not have been put in. In one scene the bar manager comes into Rimmer and Kryten's dressing room to tell them that they are sacked for un-starting a barroom brawl. In fact he says: "I'm addressing the one prat in the country who has bothered to get a hold of this recording, turn it round and actually work out the rubbish that I'm saying. What a poor, sad life he's got!" At the very end (beginning?) of the reverse barroom brawl, an "Action!", said by Ed Bye can be heard.

The character of Kryten was originally intended as a one-off appearance in the series-two episode "Kryten". The character returned mainly to broaden the story potential as Lister was the only person who could really do anything; Rimmer, a hologram, could not touch anything, the Cat could not be bothered to touch anything, and Holly was incompetent and immobile. The series was becoming difficult to write for, so at the insistence of Naylor, Kryten returned to complete the team.

Grant and Naylor had approached David Ross with the intention of bringing him back to play the regular role of Kryten. Ross was in the stage play A Flea in Her Ear and thus not available, so they went to see Robert Llewellyn at the advice of Paul Jackson. Llewellyn was in a stage show called Mammon: Robot Born of a Woman, playing a robot. They saw his performance and were impressed.

The very first scene that Llewellyn filmed was in the episode "Bodyswap" which involved him lighting candles with his fingers. He was wired up for the flame to ignite from his fingertip. The problem was that it was wet on the set and he was sweating so the wiring was backfiring and shocking him. The scene was cut out and never broadcast.

"Backwards" world guest stars includes Maria Friedman as the Waitress, Tony Hawks as a Compere, Anna Palmer as a Customer in Cafe and Arthur Smith as the Pub Manager.

Cultural references
A Star Wars style scroll is used to explain all the occurrences that had happened between Series II and III. (See also Dad (Red Dwarf episode)). This was the first Red Dwarf episode to parody the Star Wars opening crawl—it was also done at the end of "Dimension Jump" in the fourth series of the show, and at the beginning of the first Red Dwarf USA pilot.

In the opening scene between Lister and the Cat, they discuss whether The Flintstones''' Wilma Flintstone is sexy or not. They come to the conclusion that they are insane for discussing such things, since she would never leave Fred.

The pre-title sequence

The Star Wars-style scrolling text is used to explain all the occurrences that had happened in the meantime between the last episode of Series II - Parallel Universe - and this, the start of series III. The text gives a brief explanation to resolve the issue of Lister's pregnancy, the reason why Holly now looked like Hilly, and why Kryten had come back aboard the Red Dwarf and why he also had changed. The Star Wars style scrolling was intentionally sped up faster than viewers could actually read for the purposes of comedy.

Here is the text:
RED DWARF III
THE SAGA CONTINUUMS
THE STORY SO FAR...
Three million years in the future, Dave Lister, the last human being alive discovers he is pregnant after a liaison with his female self in a parallel universe. His pregnancy concludes with the successful delivery of twin boys, Jim and Bexley. However, because the twins were conceived in another universe, with different physical laws, they suffer from highly accelerated growth rates, and are both eighteen years old within three days of being born. In order to save their lives, Lister returns them to the universe of their origin, where they are reunited with their father (a woman), and are able to lead comparatively normal lives. Well, as normal as you can be if you've been born in a parallel universe and your father's a woman and your mother's a man and you're eighteen years three days after your birth.
Shortly afterwards, Kryten, the service mechanoid who had left the ship after being rescued from his own crashed vessel, the Nova 5, is found in pieces after his space bike crash lands onto an asteroid. Lister rebuilds the 'noid, but is unable to recapture his former personality.
Meanwhile, Holly, the increasingly erratic Red Dwarf computer, performs a head sex change operation on himself. He bases his new face on Hilly, a female computer with whom he'd once fallen madly in love.
And now the saga continuums
AND NOW THE SAGA CONTINUUMS...
RED DWARF III
THE SAME GENERATION
-NEARLY-

Reception
The episode was originally broadcast on the British television channel BBC2 on 14 November 1989 in the 9:00pm evening time slot. As with all episodes in the third series, "Backwards" gained healthy viewing figures, increasing on Series II efforts.

Although Series III was received well as a whole, "Backwards" was picked out as a highlight. One review described it as "a particularly inspired episode, making brilliant use of video tricks to enhance the intricate details of the storyline."  Sci-Fi Dimensions described it as the best episode of the series, and said that "admittedly, this episode is inconsistent in its treatment of the backwards principles, but even the inconsistencies are part of the fun!" Sci-Fi.com agreed that the episode was "the season's best" and "has the season's best philosophical rant". The Red Dwarf Smegazine readers poll listed the episode at number four with 7.1% of the votes.

Remastering

The remastering of Series I to III was carried out during the late 1990s. Changes included replacement of the opening credits, giving the picture a colour grade and filmising, computer generated special effects of Red Dwarf and many more visual and audio enhancements.

Changes made specific to "Backwards" include an animated shot of the ejected Rimmer has been added to the opening scene with Starbug with scream and thump sounds enhanced.  Starbug's sounds have been remixed and enhanced throughout. A new time-hole tunnel sequence has been added when Starbug travels through it. POV landscape shots have been added as Starbug enters the backwards Earth. Fire elements and sound effects have been added to the Starbug crash. The cafe exterior has been added as a transitional shot. The cloaking Starbug has been added to the existing empty shot of Lister and Cat arriving on 'backwards' Earth. The end credit sequence has been flipped and reads in reverse.

See also
 Backwards (novel), the fourth Red Dwarf'' novel which uses the Backwards theme for most of the plot. 
 Time loop
 Time travel

Notes

References

External links

Series III episode guide at www.reddwarf.co.uk

Red Dwarf III episodes
1989 British television episodes
Television episodes about time travel